November 19 - Eastern Orthodox liturgical calendar - November 21

All fixed commemorations below are observed on December 3 by Orthodox Churches on the Old Calendar.

For November 20, Orthodox Churches on the Old Calendar commemorate the Saints listed on November 7.

Feasts

 Forefeast of the Entry into the Temple of the Most Holy Theotokos.

Saints

 Martyr Dasius of Dorostolum, Romania (303)
 Martyrs Eustathios the Deacon, Thespesios, and Anatolios, of Nicaea (312)
 Martyrs of Persia under Shapur II (343):
 Hieromartyrs Nerses, Bishop of Shahrqart (Kirkuk) and his disciple Martyr Joseph;
 Hieromartyrs John, Shapur, and Isaac, Bishops of Seit Selok (by stoning); Hypatius (Papias) and Isaac, Presbyters (by beheading); and Jonam the ascetic;
 Martyrs Guhshtazad the eunuch (Azades), Sasanis, Noelmaris and Zarouantinis (Zaun), of Lashom, lanced for refusing to sacrifice to the sun god of the Persians;
 Virgin-martyrs Thekla, Bautha, Denachis, Tatun, Mama, Malochia, Ana, Nana, Asti and Malach, by the sword, for refusing to worship the Persian fire god.
 Martyrs Bassus and 42 companions in Heraclea in Thrace.
 Saint Isaac, Bishop of Armenia (440)
 Saint Proclus of Constantinople, Archbishop of Constantinople (447)
 Venerable Gregory Decapolites (816)
 Venerable Theoctistus the Confessor, Patrician (855)

Pre-Schism Western saints

 Martyrs Octavius, Solutor and Adventor, patron-saints of Turin in Italy where they were martyred (297)
 Martyrs Ampelus and Gaius, in Messina in Sicily under Diocletian (c. 302)
 Saint Maxentia, born in Ireland, she settled as an anchoress near Senlis in France, where she was put to death at the place now called Pont-Sainte-Maxence (c. 450)
 Saint Benignus of Milan, Archbishop of Milan (c. 477)
 Saint Silvester, Bishop of Châlons-sur-Saône in France (c. 525)
 Saint Simplicius of Verona, Bishop of Verona in Italy (c. 535)
 Saint Eval (Uvol, Urfol), a Bishop in Cornwall (6th century)
 Saint Autbodus (Autbod), born in Ireland, he preached in Artois, Hainault and Picardy in the north of France and Belgium (690)
 Saint Eudo (Eudon, Eudes Odo), a monk at Lérins Abbey in France, he founded the monastery of Corméry-en-Velay (Charmillac), later called Saint-Chaffre (c. 760)
 Saint Hippolyte of Belley, Bishop of Belley, then hermit in Saint-Claude in Franche-Comté (769)
 Saint Edmund the Martyr, King of East Anglia (869)
 Saint Leo of Nonantula, monk and abbot of Nonantola Abbey near Modena in Italy (1000)
 Saint Bernward of Hildesheim, Bishop of Hildesheim in Germany (1022)

Post-Schism Orthodox saints

 Saint Sozomenos, Bishop of Karpaseia in Cyprus, and Wonderworker (12th century)  ( see also: November 21 )
 Venerable Diodorus of George Hill, Solovki, Abbot of Yuregorsk (1633)
 Saint Parasceva (Rodimtseva), Abbess of Toplovsky Convent, Simferopol (1928)

New martyrs and confessors

 New Hieromartyr Macarius (Karmazin), Bishop of Dnepropetrovsk (Ekaterinoslav) (1937) 
 New Hieromartyrs Alexis Amanov, Alexander Sakharov, and Vladimir Medvediuk, John Zabolotny, Alexis Nikatov, Basil Kandelabrov, Nicholas Zelenov, John Sarva, Emilian Panasevich, Nicholas Pokrovsky, Priests (1937)
 New Hieromartyr Arsenius (Dmitriev), abbot, of the Tikhvin Monastery (1937) 
 New Hieromartyr Eutychius (Kachur), abbot, of the St. Marcian Skete, Ukraine (1937) 
 New Hieromartyr Hilarion (Pisarets), hieromonk of Glinsk Hermitage (1937)
 New Nun-martyr Ioannikia (Kozhevnikova), Abbess of the Convent of the Entry of the Theotokos (Tikhvin) (1937) 
 New Woman Hieromartyr Tatiana Fomicheva (after 1937)

Icon gallery

Notes

References

Sources
 November 20 / December 3. Orthodox Calendar (PRAVOSLAVIE.RU).
 December 3 / November 20. Holy Trinity Russian Orthodox Church (A parish of the Patriarchate of Moscow).
 November 20. OCA - The Lives of the Saints.
 The Autonomous Orthodox Metropolia of Western Europe and the Americas (ROCOR). St. Hilarion Calendar of Saints for the year of our Lord 2004. St. Hilarion Press (Austin, TX). p. 87.
 The Twentieth Day of the Month of November. Orthodoxy in China.
 November 20. Latin Saints of the Orthodox Patriarchate of Rome.
 The Roman Martyrology. Transl. by the Archbishop of Baltimore. Last Edition, According to the Copy Printed at Rome in 1914. Revised Edition, with the Imprimatur of His Eminence Cardinal Gibbons. Baltimore: John Murphy Company, 1916. p. 358-359.
 Rev. Richard Stanton. A Menology of England and Wales, or, Brief Memorials of the Ancient British and English Saints Arranged According to the Calendar, Together with the Martyrs of the 16th and 17th Centuries. London: Burns & Oates, 1892. pp. 559–561.
Greek Sources
 Great Synaxaristes:  20 ΝΟΕΜΒΡΙΟΥ. ΜΕΓΑΣ ΣΥΝΑΞΑΡΙΣΤΗΣ.
  Συναξαριστής. 20 Νοεμβρίου. ECCLESIA.GR. (H ΕΚΚΛΗΣΙΑ ΤΗΣ ΕΛΛΑΔΟΣ). 
  20/11/2015. Ορθόδοξος Συναξαριστής. 
Russian Sources
  3 декабря (20 ноября). Православная Энциклопедия под редакцией Патриарха Московского и всея Руси Кирилла (электронная версия). (Orthodox Encyclopedia - Pravenc.ru).
  20 ноября по старому стилю / 3 декабря по новому стилю. Русская Православная Церковь - Православный церковный календарь на 2018 год.

November in the Eastern Orthodox calendar